Samuel Asklöf (born Feb 12, 1998) is a Former Swedish professional ice hockey centre who played in the Swedish Hockey League (SHL).

References 

1998 births
Living people
Brynäs IF players
Swedish ice hockey centres
People from Sandviken Municipality
Sportspeople from Gävleborg County
21st-century Swedish people